Kuopio sub-region is a subdivision of Northern Savonia and one of the Sub-regions of Finland since 2009.

Municipalities
 Kuopio
 Siilinjärvi

Politics
Results of the 2018 Finnish presidential election:

 Sauli Niinistö   65.3%
 Pekka Haavisto   11.1%
 Laura Huhtasaari   6.4%
 Paavo Väyrynen   6.2%
 Matti Vanhanen   5.0%
 Tuula Haatainen   3.0%
 Merja Kyllönen   2.7%
 Nils Torvalds   0.5%

Sub-regions of Finland
Geography of North Savo